The following lists events that happened during 1894 in South Africa.

Incumbents
 Governor of the Cape of Good Hope and High Commissioner for Southern Africa:Henry Brougham Loch.
 Governor of the Colony of Natal: Walter Hely-Hutchinson.
 State President of the Orange Free State: Francis William Reitz.
 State President of the South African Republic: Paul Kruger.
 Prime Minister of the Cape of Good Hope: Cecil John Rhodes.
 Prime Minister of the Colony of Natal: .

Events

June
 25 – Paul Kruger, President of the Transvaal Republic, meets British High Commissioner Sir Henry Loch in Pretoria to discuss the grievances of the Uitlanders.

August
 22 – The Natal Indian Congress is founded by Mahatma Gandhi.

September
 Mahatma Gandhi becomes the first Indian to be enrolled as an Advocate of the Supreme Court of Natal.

October
 1 – The Owl Club of Cape Town, a dining club, has its first formal meeting.
 20 – The railway line between Lourenço Marques and Pretoria is completed at Balmoral.

November
 18 – The railway line between Lourenço Marques and Pretoria is opened to traffic.

Unknown date
 The Glen Grey Act is passed in the Cape of Good Hope to control African labour and land.

Births
 12 March – Willem Lambertus van Warmelo, compiler of Afrikaanse Liedjies, born in the Netherlands.
 20 March – Jan Hofmeyr, Prime Minister of South Africa. (d. 1948)
 1 May – Elizabeth Johanna Bosman, author under the pen name Marie Linde (d. 1963)
 23 August – Andries Albertus Pienaar, author under the pen name Sangiro, born in Broederstroom. (d. 1979)
 5 October – Bevil Rudd, South African athlete. (d. 1948)

Deaths

Railways

Railway lines opened
 3 October – Cape Western – Vryburg to Mafeking, .
 18 November – Transvaal – Airlie to Pretoria, .

Locomotives

Cape
 The Port Elizabeth Harbour Board places the first of eight 0-4-0 saddle-tank locomotives in shunting service at the Port Elizabeth Harbour.

Transvaal
 The Nederlandsche-Zuid-Afrikaansche Spoorweg-Maatschappij of the Zuid-Afrikaansche Republiek (Transvaal Republic) places three  rack tank locomotives in service on the rack section between Waterval Onder and Waterval Boven.

References

 
South Africa
Years in South Africa